Wizo is a German punk rock band from Sindelfingen, that formed in 1985. Their messages run from political to humorous; the band espouses left-wing politics and describes themselves as "against Nazis, racists, sexists, and other assholes!" The band split up in March 2005 and reunited in November 2009. Wizo's music is characterised by a combination of humorous and political lyrics with a fast, melodic punk rock sound. Wizo is considered part of the German movement known as "Fun-Punk".

History
Jochen Bix founded the band "Wieso" (meaning "why?") with friends in Sindelfingen, a town in the vicinity of Stuttgart. In 1986, they altered their name to "Wizo" and got their first gig in 1987. In 1988, Wizo released their first demo tape, followed by a second in 1990. Jochen only sang a few songs, including the Judas Priest cover, "Breaking the Law". He then left and Axel Kurth became the front man.

Later that year, Wizo founded their own label,  and released the Klebstoff ("Glue") EP, their first vinyl record.

In 1991, für'n Arsch ("In vain", lit. "for the ass") was released. The band also gained attention for an illegal public performance on a truck outside of a courthouse while Manfred Krug, a TV celebrity, was on trial for a road rage incident.

In 1992, their first CD, Bleib Tapfer ("Stay Brave") was released. On the first anniversary of German pop-star Roy Black's death, Wizo released the single "Roy Black ist tot" ("Roy Black Is Dead") as a dubious tribute. The tribute in question was a punk cover of a children's song with the lyrics altered to a German version of "Roy Black is dead, Roy Black is dead." It was named the worst CD of the year by the Bild-Zeitung, a major German tabloid.

In 1994, their next CD, Uuaarrgh! (onomatopoeic, like a big "ouch", as in comics) was released, which sold 100,000 copies. Later that year, due to the "glorification of violence" and "illegal anti-state statements" present in the song "Kein Gerede" ("No idle talk"), the album Bleib Tapfer was indexed by the Federal Department for Media Harmful to Young Persons and was only available to be sold to adults through very restricted channels.

Wizo performed at the Chaos Days in 1994.

In 1995, Wizo released Herrenhandtasche ("Man purse") and performed on the Warped Tour. Later that year, the band opened for Die Ärzte.

In 1996, Wizo's lineup changed; Ingo Hahn replaced their long-standing drummer, Charly Zasko, and he and Axel "are fortunately no longer in contact." With Ingo, "Doof wie Scheiße" ("Dumb as Shit") was also recorded.

In 1997, the band released Weihnachten stinkt! ("Christmas stinks!"), a split EP with the Japanese punk band Hi-Standard. The band also received a criminal complaint from Wilhelm Gegenfurtner, the Vicar General of the Roman Catholic Diocese of Regensburg over their depiction of a crucified pig on their album Uuaarrgh! and on t-shirts, which he claimed violated Germany's blasphemy law, §166 StGB for "Defamation of religious denominations, religious societies and World view associations". The band offered to stop selling the T-Shirt if the Catholic Church put a sign on the Judensau, an anti-semitic carving on the Regensburg Cathedral dating to 1330. The artwork is censored from later pressings of the album with a reference to a court decision.

In 1998, WIZO released Kraut & Rüben EP ("Cabbage and Carrots", also "higgledy piggledy") on the label Fat Wreck Chords, containing the songs that were already popular in Germany, but unknown to the rest of the world. That year, Herr Guhl replaced Ingo as drummer.

In September 2004, WIZO made a first in the music industry by releasing a single on USB flash drive, titled as the Stick EP. In addition to five high bitrate MP3s, it also included a video, pictures, lyrics, and tabs.

In November 2004, coinciding with the release of their album Anderster (lit. "differenter"), Wizo announced their intent to dissolve in March 2005, upon the conclusion of a farewell tour.

In November 2009, they announced a new album and a tour for 2010 on their official Homepage.

Wizo released the album Punk gibt's nicht umsonst (Teil III) on 13 June 2014. In 2016, their album Der was released.

Lineup
For most of their history, the band has performed as a power trio.

Discography
 für'n Arsch (1991)
 Bleib Tapfer (1992)
 All That She Wants EP (1993)
 Uuaarrgh! (1994)
 Mindhalálig Punk (split with Aurora) (1994)
 Herrenhandtasche (1995)
 Weihnachten stinkt! (split EP with Hi-Standard) (1997)
 Kraut & Rüben EP (1998)
 Stick EP (2004)
 Anderster (2004)
 Punk gibt's nicht umsonst! (Teil III) (2014)
 Der (2016)

References

External links

 Official Page
 Official Page from the Wizo's Label Hulk Räckorz

German punk rock groups
Deutschpunk
Fat Wreck Chords artists
Musical groups established in 1985
1985 establishments in West Germany
Musical groups disestablished in 2005
Musical groups reestablished in 2009